Cryptosara is a genus of moths of the family Crambidae.

Species
Cryptosara auralis (Snellen, 1872)
Cryptosara caritalis (Walker, 1859)
Cryptosara vadonalis Marion, 1956

References

Pyraustinae
Crambidae genera